The 1957 Arkansas Razorbacks football team represented the University of Arkansas in the Southwest Conference (SWC) during the 1957 NCAA University Division football season. In their third year under head coach Jack Mitchell, the Razorbacks compiled a 6–4 record (2–4 against SWC opponents), finished in a tie for fifth place in the SWC, and outscored all opponents by a combined total of 187 to 134.

Razorback punter/fullback and co-captain Gerald Nesbitt was fourth in the nation in yards per punt, with 42.0.

Schedule

References

Arkansas
Arkansas Razorbacks football seasons
Arkansas Razorbacks football